Menahem ben Benjamin Recanati (
1223–1290) was an Italian rabbi who was born and died in the city of Recanati, who devoted the chief part of his writings to the Kabbalah.

Works
In addition to the halachic rulings collected in Piskei Recanati (his only halachic work), Recanati wrote a cabalistic commentary on the Torah, a commentary on the siddur, and discussions of the commandments. Piskei Recanati was first published in Bologna, 1538, and was published several times thereafter.
 Perush 'Al ha-Torah (Venice, 1523), a work full of mystical deductions and meanings based upon a textual interpretation of the Bible; it describes many visions and celestial revelations claimed to have been experienced by the author, who was influenced by cabalistic ideas, and expresses the highest respect for all cabalistical authors, even the most recent apocryphal ones. The work was republished with a commentary by Mordecai Jaffe, at Lublin in 1595 and was also translated into Latin by Pico di Mirandola.
 Perush ha-Tefillot and Ṭa'ame ha-Miẓwot, published together (Constantinople, 1543–1544; Basel, 1581). Like the preceding work, these are strongly tinctured with German mysticism. Recanati frequently quotes Judah he-Hasid of Regensburg, Eleazar of Worms, and their disciples, and alludes also to the Spanish cabalists, Nahmanides among them. He is rarely original, quoting almost always other authorities. Although Recanati had a high reputation for sanctity, he exercised less influence on his contemporaries than upon posterity. To assist him in his cabalistic researches, he studied logic and philosophy; and he endeavors to support the cabala by philosophical arguments.
Pisḳe Hilkot, Bologna, 1538.

References 
 Menahem Recanati – Commentary on the Daily Prayers: Flavius Mithridates’ Latin Translation, the Hebrew Text, and an English Version, edited with introduction and notes by Giacomo Corazzol, two volumes, 860 pages. [THE KABBALISTIC LIBRARY OF GIOVANNI PICO DELLA MIRANDOLA 3, Giulio Busi, general editor] Torino: Nino Aragno Editore, 2008.

13th-century Italian rabbis
Kabbalists
13th-century births
13th-century deaths
Exponents of Jewish law
Recanati family
People from Recanati
Authors of books on Jewish law